Willie Nepomuceno (born July 8, 1948),  is a Filipino impersonator, satirist, and best known for his impersonation of political personalities, especially Philippine presidents such as Ferdinand Marcos, Fidel V. Ramos, Joseph Estrada, Benigno Aquino III and Rodrigo Duterte.

Personal life
In 2014, Nepomuceno's then 16-year-old grandson Sean Gabriel was shot and injured in Marikina City.

Discography

Studio albums
Ako Ay Ikaw Rin
Willie's Way (1984)
Snap Revolution: The Untold Story of People Power (1987)
Menemis Willie Nep (1991)
Willie Nep for President (Vote One, Take All)
Love Album (2005)

Singles
"Opisina" / "Blueseal" (1991)
"Grabeng Traffic" (1992)

See also
Comedy in the Philippines
Martial Law under Ferdinand Marcos
Sic O' Clock News

External links

References

Living people
Filipino male comedians
Satirists
1948 births